Lloyd Memorial High School is a high school located in Erlanger, Kentucky.  Part of the Erlanger-Elsmere School District, it has an enrollment of 515 students in grades 9-12.

Its boundary includes a portion of Erlanger and a portion of Elsmere.

History
Lloyd Memorial High School was established in 1928 upon the merger of the Erlanger and Elsmere school districts.  The school was named after the pharmacist John Uri Lloyd, who gave money and books for the new school. In 1956, the school was one of the first high schools in the United States to be racially desegregated after the United States Supreme Court's decision in Brown v. Board of Education.  Its success in doing so was featured in a Life magazine article.

Notable alumni
Charles Johnson, NFL wide receiver
Billy Lyon, NFL defensive end/tackle

References

External links
Lloyd Memorial High School home page

Educational institutions established in 1928
Schools in Kenton County, Kentucky
Public high schools in Kentucky
1928 establishments in Kentucky